Clare Rosemary Sandars (24 April 1934 – 3 November 2007) was an English child screen actress. She was the daughter of John William Eric Graves Sandars, a businessman (and grandson of Henry Cyril Percy Graves, 5th Baron Graves), and Margaret Mary Elwes (daughter of the singer Gervase Elwes).

Career

As a child actress, Clare Sandars notably appeared as Mrs. Miniver's daughter Judy in Mrs. Miniver. There is a scene in Mrs Miniver where she plays Mendelssohn's "Wedding March" on the piano for the family. She was given uncredited parts in two other films.

Family
Clare Sandars married Sir James Napier Finnie McEwen, Bt. in 1958; they had three daughters. In 1973, she married English investment banker Kenneth Wagg.

Filmography

References

External links
 

1934 births
2007 deaths
British film actresses
20th-century British actresses
English child actresses
Actresses from London
Wives of baronets
20th-century English women
20th-century English people